George Rippey Stewart (May 31, 1895 – August 22, 1980) was an American historian, toponymist, novelist, and a professor of English at the University of California, Berkeley. His 1959 book, Pickett's Charge, a detailed history of the final attack at Gettysburg, was called "essential for an understanding of the Battle of Gettysburg".  His 1949 post-apocalyptic novel Earth Abides won the first International Fantasy Award in 1951.

Early life and university career

Born in Sewickley, Pennsylvania, George Rippey Stewart, Jr. was the son of engineer George Rippey Stewart Sr. (died 1937), who designed gasworks and electric railways and later became a citrus "rancher" in Southern California, and Ella Wilson Stewart (died 1937). The younger Stewart earned a bachelor's degree from Princeton University in 1917, an MA from the University of California, Berkeley, and his Ph.D. in English literature from Columbia University in 1922. He accepted a position in the English department at Berkeley in 1923.  After his father died, he dropped the "Jr." from his name.

Stewart was a founding member of the American Name Society in 1956–57. He once served as an expert witness in a murder trial as a specialist in family names. His best-known academic work is Names on the Land: A Historical Account of Place-Naming in the United States (1945; reprinted, New York Review Books, 2008). He wrote three other books on names: A Concise Dictionary of American Place-Names (1970), Names on the Globe (1975), and American Given Names (1979).  His scholarly works on the poetic meter of ballads (published under the name George R. Stewart, Jr.), beginning with his 1922 Ph.D. dissertation at Columbia, remain important in their field.

Works

As an author, Stewart's output was at once diverse, original, and important. Ordeal by Hunger, Pickett's Charge, and other works are examinations of American history, but are unusual in their probing of the interaction of human beings with their physical and social environments.  His greatest achievement as a novelist, Earth Abides, takes somewhat the same perspective, but in the context of a collapse of civilization, in which everything formerly taken for granted about civilization and the situation of human beings in their environment can no longer be assumed. This radically altered circumstance permitted Stewart to raise and examine issues rarely, if ever, tackled by other novelists.  East of Giants is historical fiction.  Man, An Autobiography is one of the very few works of speculative anthropology, in which he attempts to deduce how key developments in prehistorical civilization must have unfolded, and also offers a wealth of original and interesting insights into the character of early civilization.  Good Lives provides a series of biographical sketches with the end in view of determining what it is that makes for a good life, an undertaking having much in common with, say, Aristotle's Nicomachean Ethics.  Not So Rich as You Think (1968) was a prescient early essay in environmentalism (Rachel Carson's Silent Spring had been published only a few years earlier, in 1962, and had a much narrower focus).  Storm (1941) takes an immense storm as its protagonist, an extraordinary departure in itself, and again teases out the consequences for human beings of this large-scale environmental disruption.  Other works, such as Names on the Land and American Ways of Life offer other unique insights and perspectives not found anywhere else. Years of the City is somewhat marred by relatively poor characterization, but is among his most ambitious books thematically, as it is concerned with the factors that lead to the rise and decline of civilizations – a topic only someone as well-versed in history as Stewart could successfully explore.  A number of trends in contemporary America can be recognized as being among those leading to decline.  Indeed, in a sense, The Years of the City is even more prescient and insightful than, say, Orwell's 1984.

Taken together, this enlightening body of work provides a breadth and depth of perspective found elsewhere only in authors like Toynbee, the Durants, and Carroll Quigley, but in a far more palatable and accessible form.  Achievements of this stature might have earned Stewart a lasting reputation as one of America's greatest writers and men of letters. However, the significance of his output was largely overlooked during his lifetime, and is now almost forgotten.  Earth Abides was re-issued in 2020 with an introduction by Kim Stanley Robinson.

He is today known primarily for his only science fiction novel Earth Abides (1949), a post-apocalyptic novel, for which he won the inaugural International Fantasy Award for fiction in 1951. It was dramatized on radio's Escape and served as an inspiration for Stephen King's The Stand, as King has stated. The Encyclopedia of Science Fiction calls it "one of the finest of all Post-Holocaust/Ruined Earth novels".

His 1941 novel Storm, featuring as its protagonist a Pacific storm called "Maria," which inspired Alan Jay Lerner and Frederick Loewe to write the song "They Call the Wind Maria" for their 1951 musical Paint Your Wagon.

Storm was dramatized as A Storm Called Maria on the November 2, 1959 episode of ABC's Walt Disney Presents. Co-produced by Ken Nelson Productions, it blended newsreel footage of several different storms to represent the mega-storm in the novel and traced the storm from its origins in Japan to the coast of California. The cast included non-actors, among them the dam superintendent George Kritsky, the telephone lineman Walt Bowen, and the highway superintendent Leo Quinn.

Another novel, Fire (1948), and an historical work, Ordeal by Hunger (1936), also evoked environmental catastrophes.

Bibliography

 The Technique of English Verse  (1930)
Bret Harte: Argonaut and Exile (1931)
English Composition, A Laboratory Course,  (1936)
Ordeal by Hunger: The Story of the Donner Party (1936; rpt. 1992).  
John Phoenix (1937)
East of the Giants (1938)
Doctor's Oral (1939)
Take your Bible in one hand;: The life of William Henry Thomes, author of A whaleman's adventures on land and sea, Lewey and I, The bushrangers, A gold hunter's adventures, etc., 1939
Storm (1941; rpt. 2003).  
Names on the Land: an historical account of place-naming in the United States (1945; reprinted 1958, 1967 [Sentry paperback], 2008).  
Man, An Autobiography (1946)
Fire (1948)
Earth Abides (1949; rpt. 2006).  
The Year of the Oath (in collaboration) (1950)
Sheep Rock (1951)
The Opening of the California Trail: the story of the Stevens party by Moses Schallenberger, 1888; edited 1953
 U.S. 40: Cross Section of the United States of America (1953)
American Ways of Life (1954)
These Men My Friends (1954)
To California by Covered Wagon (1954). Reprinted as Pioneers Go West (1987)
The Years of the City (1955)
N.A. 1: The North-South Continental Highway (1957)
Pickett's Charge: A Microhistory of the Final Attack at Gettysburg, July 3, 1863, 1959 Revised in 1963.
The California Trail (1962)
Committee of Vigilance (1964)
Good Lives (1967)
Not So Rich as You Think (1968)
The Department of English at the University of California, Berkeley (1968)
A Concise Dictionary of American Place-Names (1970)
Names on the Globe (1975)
American Given Names (1979).

See also
 Tropical cyclone naming
 George R. Stewart Peak

References

Sources
"Scott, Donald, The Life and Truth of George R. Stewart;  A Literary Biography of the Author of EARTH ABIDES". .
"George R. Stewart, toponymist", Names, Volume 24, 1976, pp. 77–85.

Audio
 OTR Network Library: Escape: "Earth Abides", parts one and two
 Two short radio episodes from Storm (1941): "Valley Rain" and "Final Success". California Legacy Project.

External links

American Name Society biography of Stewart by William Bright
Tribute website GeorgeRStewart.com
Donald M. Scott's essay on George R. Stewart, on the U. S. Route 40 website
Extensive list of publications by and about George R. Stewart
U.C. Berkeley interviews with George R. Stewart on the writing process
Guide to the George Rippey Stewart Papers at The Bancroft Library
  Stewart weblog by Stewart Biographer Donald M. Scott
 
 

1895 births
1980 deaths
People from Sewickley, Pennsylvania
American academics of English literature
20th-century American novelists
American male novelists
American science fiction writers
Environmental fiction writers
Novelists from Pennsylvania
Toponymists
Writers from the San Francisco Bay Area
20th-century American male writers
20th-century American non-fiction writers
American male non-fiction writers
Princeton University alumni
University of California, Berkeley alumni
Columbia Graduate School of Arts and Sciences alumni